Alexander is a city in Rush County, Kansas, United States.  As of the 2020 census, the population of the city was 54.

History

19th century
Alexander is the oldest city in Rush County, Kansas.  It was established in 1869 after becoming an important stopping point on the Fort Hays/Fort Dodge Trail (officially a part of the Santa Fe Trail).  The name of the town originated from Alexander Harvey a Scottish emigrant who operated a stockaded trading post on the trail crossing of the Wet Walnut Creek.  Harvey was a prominent and connected figure in western settlement.  He was a friend of renown trapper, trader, and Indian Agent William Bent who established Bent's Fort in Eastern Colorado.  Harvey's daughter Adaline at age 20 married the 60 year-old Bent.

In its early days, Alexander was a trading post for trappers, buffalo hunters, wild horse wranglers, and other early Westerners.  Buffalo Bill Cody, George Custer, and other prominent figures in American western settlement traveled through the community.  Alexander Harvey himself was a former member of the 6th Cavalry.

The first post office in Alexander was established in February 1874.

At its peak in the late 1800s, the community included a bank, hospital, newspaper, lumberyard, a Santa Fe Railroad Depot, hotel, multiple churches, multiple grocery and general stores.  At varying times, the community's commercial activity has included cream and egg buying stations, a railroad stockyard for shipping cattle and sheep to eastern markets, and multiple grain elevators.

21st century
Today, Alexander's abandoned three story brick school building is a landmark on K-96 highway. The former Alexander State Bank Building has been re-built and is now the operations and maintenance building for NJR Clean Energy.  The community still has the largest grain elevator in Rush County.  The elevator is a farmer's cooperative elevator owned by area farmers.  Grumbine's Metal Scrap Yard is the other commercial entity in the community.

In 2015, the "Alexander Wind Farm" was constructed south of Alexander.  It cost about $85 Million and generates 48 Megawatt of power.  The Alexander Wind Farm became commercially operable on January 1, 2016.

Geography
Alexander is located at  (38.469371, -99.552415).

Climate
The climate in this area is characterized by hot, humid summers and generally mild to cool winters.  According to the Köppen Climate Classification system, Alexander has a humid subtropical climate, abbreviated "Cfa" on climate maps.

Demographics

2010 census
As of the census of 2010, there were 65 people, 31 households, and 20 families residing in the city. The racial makeup of the city was 100.0% White.

There were 31 households, of which 16.1% had children under the age of 18 living with them, 54.8% were married couples living together, 6.5% had a female householder with no husband present, 3.2% had a male householder with no wife present, and 35.5% were non-families. 35.5% of all households were made up of individuals, and 19.4% had someone living alone who was 65 years of age or older. The average household size was 2.10 and the average family size was 2.70.

The median age in the city was 53.3 years. 13.8% of residents were under the age of 18; 7.7% were between the ages of 18 and 24; 12.2% were from 25 to 44; 41.6% were from 45 to 64; and 24.6% were 65 years of age or older. The gender makeup of the city was 40.0% male and 60.0% female.

2000 census
As of the census of 2000, there were 75 people, 34 households, and 19 families residing in the city. The racial makeup of the city was 100.00% White. Hispanic or Latino of any race were 1.33% of the population.

There were 34 households, out of which 23.5% had children under the age of 18 living with them, 50.0% were married couples living together, 5.9% had a female householder with no husband present, and 44.1% were non-families. 35.3% of all households were made up of individuals, and 26.5% had someone living alone who was 65 years of age or older. The average household size was 2.21 and the average family size was 3.00.

In the city, the population was spread out, with 21.3% under the age of 18, 5.3% from 18 to 24, 28.0% from 25 to 44, 16.0% from 45 to 64, and 29.3% who were 65 years of age or older. The median age was 44 years. For every 100 females, there were 82.9 males. For every 100 females age 18 and over, there were 90.3 males.

The median income for a household in the city was $12,083, and the median income for a family was $28,125. Males had a median income of $18,542 versus $20,000 for females. The per capita income for the city was $11,803. There were 30.8% of families and 31.9% of the population living below the poverty line, including 40.0% of under eighteens and 11.1% of those over 64.

Education
The community is served by La Crosse USD 395 public school district.

Alexander High School was closed in 1966 through school unification. The Alexander High School mascot was Whippets.

References

Further reading

External links
 Alexander - Directory of Public Officials
 History of Cities in Rush County
 Alexander Info, Legends of Kansas
 Alexander City Map, KDOT

Cities in Kansas
Cities in Rush County, Kansas